An incomplete list of the tallest structures in France. The list contains all types of structures, may be incomplete and should be expanded.

Overseas territories of France

See also
 List of tallest buildings in France
 List of tallest buildings and structures in the Paris region

External links
 Map of the tallest structures in France at Mum, I'm Here!
 http://skyscraperpage.com/diagrams/?searchID=37729599
 Air-traffic obstacle list

France
Tallest